Rag Trade (1966–1978) was a British-bred Thoroughbred racehorse who competed in National Hunt racing.

He is best known for winning the 1976 Grand National, denying Red Rum a third victory.

Background
Sired in Ireland by Menelek out of The Rage, Rag Trade was bred by Ian Williams, the son of Evan Williams who had won the 1937 Grand National on Royal Mail.

Racing career
Rag Trade's first trainer was George Fairbairn but by the time he was nine years old his racing record was poor, having only won two races. Due to this he was put up for sale in 1975 and was bought by Pierre Raymond for 18,000 guineas, in a public auction at Doncaster.

Bessone later sold two 25% shares in the horse to businessmen William Lawrie and Herbert Keane. With trainer Arthur Pitt the horse ran the 1975 Grand National under up-and-coming jockey John Francome. However, the lack of preparation was evident and Rag Trade could only finish in tenth place.

However, following the National Rag Trade quickly improved and three weeks later he won the Midlands Grand National at Uttoexeter before he was sent to trainer Fred Rimell at his Kinnersley stables.

With Rimell as trainer and under stable jockey John Burke, Rag Trade had a successful 1976 with five wins including the Welsh Grand National at Chepstow.

This good start to the year saw Rag Trade start the 1976 Grand National in great form with odds of 14-1 but a huge challenge of stopping the formidable Red Rum.

Rag Trade started the race well but was in contention for the lead with four other horses approaching the last fence.  Red Rum was leading with Rag Trade close behind but Rag Trade accelerated to gain a four length advantage over the heavier Red Rum. Rag Trade held this lead to the finish to win the race.

Rag Trade ran in the 1978 Grand National under new trainer George Fairbairn and jockey Jonjo O'Neill. He started the race as 8/1 favourite but pulled up lame during the second circuit before fence 22, after which he was euthanised.

Grand National record

Pedigree

References

1966 racehorse births
Racehorses bred in the United Kingdom
Racehorses trained in the United Kingdom
Grand National winners
1978 racehorse deaths